Te Huruhuru  ( 1800s – 1861) was a notable New Zealand tribal leader. Of Māori descent, he identified with the Ngāi Tahu iwi.

References

1861 deaths
Ngāi Tahu people
Year of birth uncertain